Nadiia Usenko (born 29 January 2000 in Kyiv) is a Ukrainian professional squash player. As of February 2018, she was ranked number 102 in the world and number 1 in Ukraine.

In 2017, she took part in The World Games.  The same year in December she was representing Ukraine at the World Championships (Manchester, United Kingdom) for the first time in the Ukrainian squash history.

Junior career
In 2011, Nadiia Usenko started to participate in the ESF (European Squash Federation) junior tournaments and managed to achieve number 1 position in the European Junior Ranking in the each of age category: GU13, GU15, GU17 and GU19. She won Dutch Junior Open title in her last junior event in 2018.

Ukrainian National Squash Team
Nadiia Usenko became a member of the National Ukrainian Squash Team in 2014 at the age of 14.

In 2018, she won a gold medal at European Team Championship in Division 3 in Riga, Latvia.

CSA squash 
In 2018, Usenko joined Trinity College Women's Squash Team. She played 3 seasons for Bantams (season 2020-2021 cancelled due to COVID). Her senior year, she was named a captain of the team. Her overall record in college squash league is 48-9.

References

2000 births
Living people
Ukrainian female squash players
Sportspeople from Kyiv
21st-century Ukrainian women

Ukrainian athletes
Competitors at the 2022 World Games